Alexandria railway station serves the town of  Alexandria, Scotland. The station is managed by ScotRail and is served by their trains on the North Clyde Line.

History 

Opened by the Caledonian and Dunbartonshire Junction Railway on 15 July 1850, it became part of a joint London, Midland and Scottish Railway and London and North Eastern Railway line during the Grouping of 1923. The line then passed on to the Scottish Region of British Railways on nationalisation in 1948.  The line through the station was double until 1973, but now only one track and platform are in use.

When sectorisation was introduced in the 1980s, the station was served by ScotRail until the privatisation of British Rail.

Facilities 

Unlike Renton, the only other intermediate station on the Balloch line, Alexandria does have a ticket office and a car park. It also has a help point, bench and bike racks located on the platform, plus a payphone in the ticket office. Although the ticket office entrance from the car park is not step-free, there is step-free access to the platform (and from the platform to the ticket office).

Passenger volume 

The statistics cover twelve month periods that start in April.

Services 

References

Bibliography

External links

 Video footage of Alexandria Station
 Station on navigable O.S. map

Railway stations in West Dunbartonshire
Former Dumbarton and Balloch Railway stations
Railway stations in Great Britain opened in 1850
SPT railway stations
Railway stations served by ScotRail
Vale of Leven